Baeolidia rieae is a species of sea slug, an aeolid nudibranch. It is a marine gastropod mollusc in the family Aeolidiidae.

Distribution
This species was described from a specimen found in  depth at Amami Ōshima Island, Japan.

Description
Baeolidia rieae has a translucent body with mottled pale brown and pearly white surface pigmentation. The rhinophores are almost smooth with small scattered papillae. The cerata are somewhat flattened and broad near the base, abruptly tapering to a cylindrical outer half.

References

Aeolidiidae
Gastropods described in 2014